is a Japanese politician of Constitutional Democratic Party of Japan, formerly of the Liberal Democratic Party and Your Party, a member of the House of Representatives in the Diet (national legislature).

Overviews 

A native of Fukuoka Prefecture, he attended Silliman University in Philippines while he was an undergraduate at International Christian University. He also received a master's degree from the Institute of Education at the University of London. He was elected to the House of Representatives for the first time in 2005.

References

External links 
  in Japanese.

Members of the House of Representatives (Japan)
Koizumi Children
Your Party politicians
Alumni of the UCL Institute of Education
Politicians from Fukuoka Prefecture
Living people
1973 births
Constitutional Democratic Party of Japan politicians
Liberal Democratic Party (Japan) politicians
Silliman University alumni